Chelegnophos is a genus of moths in the family Geometridae.

Species
 Chelegnophos alaianus Viidalepp, 1988
 Chelegnophos badakhshanus (Wiltshire, 1967)
 Chelegnophos fractifasciata (Püngeler, 1901)
 Chelegnophos orbicularia (Püngeler, 1904)
 Chelegnophos puengeleri (Bohatch, 1910)
 Chelegnophos ravistriolaria (Wehrli, 1922)
 Chelegnophos tholeraria (Wehrli, 1922)

References
 Chelegnophos at Markku Savela's Lepidoptera and Some Other Life Forms
 Natural History Museum Lepidoptera genus database

Gnophini